Iranian license plates have had European standard dimensions since 2005. Each province in Iran has multiple unique, two-digit codes that are included at the right end of the license plates in a distinguished square outline, above which the word  or "Iran" has been written. A province's license plates will not be issued with a new code unless all possible combinations with the old code have been issued. In Tehran, the first code to be issued for the province was code 11, and subsequent codes all increased by 11 as well (meaning codes 11, 22, 33, ..., 99 are unique to Tehran.) Ever since code 99 was fully issued, the new codes for Tehran have started from 10 and subsequently increased by 10. Most province codes increased by 10 based on the first code issued for their province. Khuzestan Province, for example, has been allocated codes 24 and 14, and code 24 will not be used before code 14 is fully issued. However, as codes started getting exhausted, numbers and letters have been assigned more liberally and without following this rule of thumb anymore

Iran's license plate format is entirely in Persian alphabet. It follows the format ## X ### - NN
 ## ### is the registration code
 X is the series letter. Each unique classification of vehicles is assigned a unique letter. For private vehicles, for example, if numbers start from 11 A 111, the letter A will not change until  numbers reach 99 A 999. Then, plates will go up to 11 B 111. These details are explained further in each section of this article.
 NN is the province code.

Letter series
Iranian license plates are entirely in Persian alphabet. This includes the numbers as well as the letter series. Below is the list of letters and the vehicle type to which they're assigned

Numbers
Iran's license plates use Persian numerals as opposed to Western Arabic numerals. Below is a table for reference:

Private vehicles
The plate is black on white. The code in the square represents the regional codes. The letter ب can be dependent on where the car's owner's principal address is located. For example, while regional code 24 belongs to Khuzestan Province, letter ب (B) is dedicated to residents of Abadan County, while letter ج (J) is dedicated to Khorramshahr County residents. The distribution of the letters has become more complicated with codes and letters being filled up, as some letters have been broken down even more, based on the initial two numbers on the license plates, and as some letters been given to multiple counties, who previously had separate letters from each other.

Nevertheless, a new policy has emerged in 2021, which is a policy of recycling previously issued but no longer in circulation numbers. It is estimated that the total capacity of Iran's numbering system is about 62 million. So far, 55 million numbers have been issued, with 60% of them no longer in circulation, and only 23 million numbers on the streets.

Private vehicles of people with disabilities
The plate is black on white. To distinguish the type of the plate, there is a wheelchair symbol. The code in the square represents the regional codes. The wheelchair symbol in the plate is fixed for all private vehicles of people with disabilities and these types of plates are issued provincially.

In each province, numbers 11 ♿︎ 111 - XX and upwards have been assigned to veterans (mostly from Iran-Iraq war) with a disability.
Numbers 51 ♿︎ 111 - XX have been assigned to everyone else with a disability.

Taxis

The plate is black on yellow. To distinguish the type of the plate, there is the letter ت which stands for the word تاکسی, meaning taxi in Persian put on the plate and the English word "taxi" above it. The code in the square represents the regional codes.

The letter ت with the word "taxi" on the plate is fixed for all taxis and these types of plates are issued provincially.

Public vehicles
The plate is black on yellow. To distinguish the type of the plate, there is the letter ع which stands for the word عمومی, meaning public in Persian put on the plate. The code in the square represents the regional codes. The letter ع on the plate is fixed for all public vehicles and these types of plates are issued provincially.

Agricultural vehicles
The plate is black on yellow. To distinguish the type of the plate, there is the letter ک which stands for the word کشاورزی, meaning agricultural in Persian put on the plate. The code in the square represents the regional codes. The letter ک on the plate is fixed for all agricultural vehicles and these types of plates are issued provincially.

Government vehicles
The plate is white on red. To distinguish the type of the plate, there is the word الف (aleph) which is how the first letter of alphabet is pronounced put on the plate. The code in the square represents the regional codes. The word الف on the plate is fixed for all governmental vehicles and these types of plates are issued provincially.

Protocol vehicles
The plate is white on red and there is the word تشریفات with its English translation under it on the plate. The rest is simply a four-digit number.

Military and law enforcement
Police license plates were introduced first on September 30, 2012. The rest of the plates were introduced on May 30, 2016, with full replacement planned to be done by March 2017.

Police (FARAJA) vehicles
The plate is white on dark green. To distinguish the type of the plate, there is the letter پ which stands for the word پلیس, meaning police in Persian put on the plate. The code in the square represents the regional codes. The letter پ on the plate is fixed for all police cars and these types of plates are issued nationally, starting from regional code 11 regardless of which province the vehicles serves.

Army Police
The following plate is installed on vehicles belonging to IRGC (Sepah Pasdaran in Persian). The plate is white on dark green. To distinguish the type of the plate, there is the letter ث is used. The code in the square represents the regional codes. The letter ث on the plate is fixed for all IRGC vehicles and these types of plates are issued nationally, starting from regional code 11 regardless of which province the vehicles serves.

Islamic Republic of Iran Army

The following plate is installed on cars belonging to Islamic Republic of Iran Army. The plate is black on a light shade of brown. To distinguish the type of the plate, there is the letter ش is used. The code in the square represents the regional codes. The letter ش on the plate is fixed for all army vehicles and these types of plates are issued nationally, starting from regional code 11 regardless of which province the vehicles serves.

Ministry of Defence

The following plate is installed on cars belonging to Ministry of Defence and Armed Forces Logistics. The plate is white on light blue. The letter ز is reserved for this type of plate. The code in the square represents the regional codes. The letter ز on the plate is fixed for all cars belonging to the ministry and these types of plates are issued nationally, starting from regional code 11 regardless of which province the vehicles serves.

General Staff of Armed Forces
The following plate is installed on cars belonging to General Staff of Armed Forces of the Islamic Republic of Iran. The plate is white on light blue. To distinguish the type of the plate, there is the letter ف is used. The code in the square represents the regional codes. The letter ف on the plate is fixed for all cars belonging to the  general staff and these types of plates are issued nationally, starting from regional code 11 regardless of which province the vehicles serves.

Historic Vehicles
This type of plate is used for older and historically significant vehicles like ones on display at museums. The plate is white on brown with the word تاریخی, meaning "historical" written above a five-digit number. On the left, there is an Iranian flag and a picture of Bagh-e Melli in Tehran. The dimensions of the plate are American-standard.

Political and services plates
The new format for political and service plates was introduced on March 6, 2016. Each country or international organization is assigned a three-digit number (like the ۳۶۵ (365) shown in both examples below). For example, 214 is reserved for Germany. So far, 133 countries have been numbered. For each country's embassy, the first two digits increase (11D, 12D or 11S, 12S).

These license plates are issued nationally, starting from regional code 11 regardless of which province the vehicles serves.

Political (e.g., diplomatic/consular corps)

Service (e.g., UNHCR)

Previous format

Temporary Passage

Previous format

Provincial codes and letter series

Provincial codes are generally given to each province. There are some exceptions to this however.
 City of Tehran is practically treated as if it were a province, even though it is part of Tehran Province
 Alborz Province and Tehran Province (except the city of Tehran) are treated as if they were one province. This is because for the first seven years that the current license plate format has been in circulation, they were indeed one united province. Alborz Province separated from Tehran Province in 2010.
 While the current license plate format came into circulation from 2003, with Khorasan Province being allocated three letters, 12, 32, and 42 (With 52 being kept as reserve for future use). Khorasan Province was however divided into three new provinces of Razavi Khorasan, North Khorasan, and South Khorasan in 2004. This division wasn't too late for the system to be revised and for the provincial codes to be readjusted. Thus, while Khorasan Razavi retained codes 12, 32, and 42, North Khorasan was given code 26, and South Khorasan was given code 52. However, it was too late to appropriately adjust the provincial code and letters for the capital cities of these two new provinces, Bojnurd and Birjand respectively. Each of these cities were allocated three new letter series out of their new provincial codes. But they were both allowed to keep the original one letter they were granted, under the provincial code 32, resulting in four letter series to fill up, in total for each. The other counties of these two new provinces had registration under codes 32 and 42 halted, and they switched to new letters under codes 26 and 52 respectively.
 There is yet another exception thanks to the matters surrounding division of Khorasan Province, and it relates to the county of Tabas. Due to local opposition to the bill that would divide Khorasan, and have Tabas County transferred to jurisdiction of Birjand in South Khorasan Province, in the year 2001, Tabas County opted to leave Khorasan Province altogether and join Yazd Province. Then, two years later, Iran introduced this current license plate format, and naturally, Tabas County was granted a letter series, under code 64, for Yazd Province. Khorasan Province was divided in the year 2004, and the province of South Khorasan was granted provincial code 52. However, fast-forward to 2012, Tabas County resolved its issues with the province of South Khorasan and eventually joined this province, as was originally intended. But, Tabas has retained its original letter, ق, under code 64, instead of switching to South Khorasan's code.

As was mentioned in the list of exceptions, within each province, letters are designated to each county. When each letter is exhausted, a new letter from the same provincial codes is granted. When the entire code is exhausted, the province is granted a new code, from which new letters are granted.

For example, while provincial code 24 belongs to Khuzestan Province, letter ب (B) is dedicated to residents of Abadan County, while letter ج (J) is dedicated to Khorramshahr County residents. The distribution of the letters has gotten more complicated with codes and letters being filled up, as some letters have been broken down even more, based on the initial two numbers on the license plates, and as some letters been given to multiple counties, who previously had separate letters from each other.

Within each province, registration numbers for all types of vehicles with the exception of private vehicles, are given province-wide, regardless of in which county the owner resides. Some types of vehicles such as police cars and diplomatic plates are allocated nationally, starting from code 11, regardless of the province in which they serve.

Provincial codes

License plates follow the format ## X ### / NN. The NN portion is a two-digit code granted to provinces.

Breakdown of codes and letters

The below 13 letters are used in private vehicle license plates.

Number 0 (zero) is only used in the provincial code, and only in the newly granted provincial codes, after 99 has been exhausted. Zero has not been used in the five-digit registration number.

Provincial codes 10 to 19

Provincial codes 20 to 29
{|  class="wikitable mw-collapsible mw-collapsed"
|+ class="nowrap" | Private Vehicle Provincial Code Allocation Table, codes 20 to 29
|-
! scope="col" style="width: 50px;" |Code
! scope="col" style="width: 50px;" |Code(English)
! scope="col" style="width: 125px;" |Province
! scope="col" style="width: 250px;" |Letter
! scope="col" style="width: 125px;" |County
! scope="col" style="width: 350px;" |Notes
|-
|style="font-size:150%"| ۲۰
| 20
| City of Tehran
|style="font-size:150%" colspan="2"| ب ج د س ص ط ق ل م ن و هـ ی
| For the purposes of vehicle registration, City of Tehran is treated as if it were an independent province
|-
|rowspan="13" style="font-size:150%"| ۲۱
|rowspan="13"| 21
|rowspan="13"| Tehran/Alborz2
|style="font-size:150%" | ب
| Eslamshahr
|
|-
|style="font-size:150%" | ج
| Robat KarimBaharestan
|
|-
|style="font-size:150%" | د
| ShahriarMalardQods
|
|-
|style="font-size:150%" | س
| VaraminPishvaQarchack
|
|-
|style="font-size:150%" | ص
| SavojbolaghTaleqanNazarabad
|
|-
|style="font-size:150%" | ط
| ShahriarMalardQods
|
|-
|style="font-size:150%" | ق
| Robat KarimBaharestan
|
|-
|style="font-size:150%" | ل
| ShahriarMalardQods
|
|-
|style="font-size:150%" | م
| VaraminPishvaQarchack
|
|-
|style="font-size:150%" | ن
| Pakdasht
|
|-
|style="font-size:150%" | و
| KarajFardisEshtehard
|
|-
|style="font-size:150%" | هـ
| ShahriarMalardQods
|
|-
|style="font-size:150%" | ی
| DamavandPardis
|
|-
|style="font-size:150%"| ۲۲
| 22
| City of Tehran
|style="font-size:150%" colspan="2"| ب ج د س ص ط ق ل م ن و هـ ی
| For the purposes of vehicle registration, City of Tehran is treated as if it were an independent province
|-
|rowspan="13" style="font-size:150%"| ۲۳
|rowspan="13"| 23
|rowspan="13"| Isfahan
|style="font-size:150%" | ب
| Kashan
|
|-
|style="font-size:150%" | ج
| Najafabad
|
|-
|style="font-size:150%" | د
| Shahreza
|
|-
|style="font-size:150%" | س
| Khomeinishahr
|
|-
|style="font-size:150%" | ص
| Golpayegan
|
|-
|style="font-size:150%" | ط
| Natanz
|
|-
|style="font-size:150%" | ق
| Ardestan
|
|-
|style="font-size:150%" | ل
| Khansar
|
|-
|style="font-size:150%" | م
| NainKhur & Biabanak
|
|-
|style="font-size:150%" | ن
| Semirom
|
|-
|style="font-size:150%" | و
| Fereydunshahr
|
|-
|style="font-size:150%" | هـ
| Falavarjan
|
|-
|style="font-size:150%" | ی
| Lenjan
|
|-
|rowspan="14" style="font-size:150%"| ۲۴
|rowspan="14"| 24
|rowspan="14"| Khuzestan
|style="font-size:150%" | ب
| Abadan
|
|-
|style="font-size:150%" | ج
| Khorramshahr
|
|-
|style="font-size:150%" | د
| Dezful
|
|-
|style="font-size:150%" | س
| BehbahanAghajari
|
|-
|style="font-size:150%" | ص
| Masjed SoleymanAndika
|
|-
|style="font-size:150%" | ط
| Mahshahr
|
|-
|style="font-size:150%" | ق
| Dasht-e AzadeganHoveyzeh
|
|-
|style="font-size:150%" | ل
| RamhormozRamshirHaftkel
|
|-
|style="font-size:150%" | م
| Andimeshk
|
|-
|style="font-size:150%" | ن
| ShushtarGotvand
|
|-
|style="font-size:150%" | و
| ShushKarkheh
|
|-
|rowspan="2" style="font-size:150%" | هـ
| Shadegan
| From [11 هـ H 111 - 24]To [53 هـ H 999 - 24]
|-
|ShadeganMahshahr
| From [54 هـ H 111 - 24] upwards
|-
|style="font-size:150%" | ی
| Izeh
|
|-
|rowspan="13" style="font-size:150%"| ۲۵
|rowspan="13"| 25
|rowspan="13"| East Azerbaijan
|style="font-size:150%" | ب
| Maragheh
|
|-
|style="font-size:150%" | ج
| Marand
|
|-
|style="font-size:150%" | د
| Miyaneh
|
|-
|style="font-size:150%" | س
| AharHurand
|
|-
|style="font-size:150%" | ص
| Sarab
|
|-
|style="font-size:150%" | ط
| Jolfa
|
|-
|style="font-size:150%" | ق
| Hashtrud
|
|-
|style="font-size:150%" | ل
| Bonab
|
|-
|style="font-size:150%" | م
| Bostanabad
|
|-
|style="font-size:150%" | ن
| Shabestar
|
|-
|style="font-size:150%" | و
| KaleybarKhoda Afarin
|
|-
|style="font-size:150%" | هـ
| Heris
|
|-
|style="font-size:150%" | ی
| Azarshahr
|
|-
|rowspan="6" style="font-size:150%"| ۲۶
|rowspan="6"| 26
|rowspan="6"| North Khorasan
|style="font-size:150%" | ب ج د
| BojnurdRaz & Jargalan
|
|-
|style="font-size:150%" | ص
| Shirvan
|
|-
|style="font-size:150%" | ط
| Esfarayen
|
|-
|style="font-size:150%" | ق
| JajarmGarmeh
|
|-
|style="font-size:150%" | ل
| Maneh & Samalqan
|
|-
|style="font-size:150%" | م
| Faruj
|
|-
|rowspan="13" style="font-size:150%"| ۲۷
|rowspan="13"| 27
|rowspan="13"| West Azerbaijan
|style="font-size:150%" | ب
| KhoyChaypareh
|
|-
|style="font-size:150%" | ج
| Mahabad
|
|-
|style="font-size:150%" | د
| MakuPoldashtShowt
|
|-
|style="font-size:150%" | س
| Salmas
|
|-
|style="font-size:150%" | ص
| Naqadeh
|
|-
|style="font-size:150%" | ط
| Miandoab
|
|-
|style="font-size:150%" | ق
| Takab
|
|-
|style="font-size:150%" | ل
| Shahin Dezh
|
|-
|style="font-size:150%" | م
| Sardasht
|
|-
|style="font-size:150%" | ن
| Bukan
|
|-
|style="font-size:150%" | و
| Piranshahr
|
|-
|style="font-size:150%" | هـ
| Chaldoran
|
|-
|style="font-size:150%" | ی
| Oshnavieh
|
|-
|rowspan="10" style="font-size:150%"| ۲۸
|rowspan="10"| 28
|rowspan="10"| Hamedan
|style="font-size:150%" | ب
| Nahavand
|
|-
|style="font-size:150%" | ج
| Malayer
|
|-
|style="font-size:150%" | د
| Tuyserkan
|
|-
|style="font-size:150%" | س
| Kabudarahang
|
|-
|style="font-size:150%" | ص
| RazanQorveh-e Darjazin
|
|-
|style="font-size:150%" | ط
| Bahar
|
|-
|style="font-size:150%" | ق
| Asadabad
|
|-
|style="font-size:150%" | ل
| Malayer
|
|-
|style="font-size:150%" | م
| Nahavand
|
|-
|style="font-size:150%" | ن
| Malayer
|
|-
|rowspan="12" style="font-size:150%"| ۲۹
|rowspan="12"| 29
|rowspan="12"| Kermanshah
|style="font-size:150%" | ب
| Eslamabad-e GharbDalahu
|
|-
|style="font-size:150%" | ج
| Gilan-e Gharb
|
|-
|style="font-size:150%" | د
| Sarpol-e Zahab''
|
|-
|style="font-size:150%" | س
| Paveh|
|-
|style="font-size:150%" | ص
| Kangavar|
|-
|style="font-size:150%" | ط
| Qasr-e Shirin|
|-
|style="font-size:150%" | ق
| Sonqor|
|-
|style="font-size:150%" | ل
| JavanrudRavansar
|
|-
|style="font-size:150%" | م
| Sahneh|
|-
|style="font-size:150%" | ن
| Harsin|
|-
|style="font-size:150%" | و
| Salas-e Babajani|
|-
|style="font-size:150%" | هـ
| Eslamabad-e GharbDalahu
|
|-
|-
!colspan="6" style=text-align:left|Notes
 Bold county name indicates the original county. The rest of the counties that are not in bold, are counties that have separated from the original county, but are still under the same code and letter as the original county
 Tehran and Alborz Provinces are treated as if they are one united province, for the purpose of assigning Provincial license plate codes.
|}

Provincial codes 30 to 39

Provincial codes 40 to 49

Provincial codes 50 to 59

Provincial codes 60 to 69

Provincial codes 70 to 79

Provincial codes 80 to 89

Provincial codes 90 to 99

Motorcycles
Motorcycle registration plates have a unique and different format. Motorcycle plates come in XXX - #####. XXX is a three-digit provincial code, followed by #####, a five-digit number. These license plates are issued provincially.

Below is a list of codes and their corresponding provinces.

Note that neither the three-digit provincial code, nor the five-digit registration number can take zero. Thus, for example, after provincial code 499, comes provincial code 511'''.

Free trade zones
The plate is black on white and consists of a five-digit number written once in Persian digits on the top and in Arabic digits on the bottom. On the left, there is an Iranian flag and the logo of the respective free trade zone with its name written in English below it.

The size of the plate is American standard.

Below are a few examples of these plates.

Anzali

Aras

Arvand

Kish

Maku

Chabahar

Qeshm

References

Iran
Iran transport-related lists
Road transport in Iran
 Registration plates